Artanovsky is a rural locality (a khutor) in Tishanskoye Rural Settlement, Nekhayevsky District, Volgograd Oblast, Russia. The population was 225 as of 2010. There are 10 streets.

Geography 
Artanovsky is located on the Tishanka River, 16 km southeast of Nekhayevskaya (the district's administrative centre) by road. Krasnovsky is the nearest rural locality.

References 

Rural localities in Nekhayevsky District